Artifacts is a compilation album by American indie rock band Beirut. It was released digitally on January 28, 2022, through Pompeii Records, and was released on vinyl and CD on April 1, 2022. The double album includes unreleased tracks, B-sides, some of Zach Condon's earliest recordings at age 14, and a re-release of the band's 2007 Lon Gisland EP. 

It was announced on October 20, 2021, with the release of the previously unreleased track "Fisher Island Sound". The second single, "So Slowly", was released on November 17, 2021, followed by the single "Fyodor Dormant" on January 6, 2022.

Track listing

Charts

References 

2022 compilation albums
Beirut (band) albums